{{DISPLAYTITLE:C25H32O3}}
The molecular formula C25H32O3 (molar mass: 380.520 g/mol, exact mass: 380.2351 u) may refer to:

 Levonorgestrel cyclopropylcarboxylate
 Nilestriol

Molecular formulas